Psephellus dealbatus, the Persian cornflower or whitewash cornflower, is a species of Psephellus native to the Caucasus Mountains and Turkey. It is widely cultivated as an ornamental perennial.

Description
The flowers of P. dealbatus resemble those of Centaurea americana in colour and form; the composite inflorescence has rosy outer florets shading to cream in the center of the  2 in. disk, surrounded by scaly bracts on a slender peduncle 18 to 24 in. long. The blooming period is in early summer.

Psephellus dealbatus is most noteworthy for its leaves. Like those of Centaurea moschata they are divided, but unlike the latter the division is quite regular. The undersides of the leaves are covered in silver hairs.

Taxonomy
The Latin epithet of dealbatus derived from the Late Latin verb dealbare 'to whitewash'.
It was first published and described by German botanist Karl Koch in Linnaea Vol.24 on page 438 in 1851.

Range
It is native to north Caucasus, Transcaucasia and Turkey but has also been introduced to Austria, the Baltic States, Belgium, Czechoslovakia, Germany, Great Britain and Poland.

Cultivation
Psephellus dealbatus is widely cultivated as an ornamental, though it is not as well known as some other members of the Asteraceae. It is widely adaptable and drought-tolerant. The flowers attract butterflies and bees. It self-seeds to a degree.

The variety 'Steenbergii' is recognized, and several cultivars are available.

Sources tracking weed species generally classify it as a "casual alien"; that is, it escapes from gardens but is not invasive. In some areas of the United States it has naturalized.

References

Cynareae
Garden plants
Plants described in 1851
Flora of Turkey
Flora of the Caucasus